Half Moon Bay is a bay of the Pacific Ocean on the coast of San Mateo County, California. The bay is approximately semi-circular, hence the name half moon, with sea access to the south. Coastal towns located there are Princeton-by-the-Sea, Miramar, El Granada, and the city of Half Moon Bay.

The surfing location Mavericks is located on the outer edge of the peninsula which forms the bay. Miramar Beach is located along the shore of the bay opposite the peninsula.

Marine species include flatfish,  the commercially important English sole, rockfish, surfperch, Pacific herring, lingcod; and abundant winter species including starry flounder and top-smelt.

The bay provides an example of a logarithmic spiral beach.

See also
Pilarcitos Creek
Half Moon Bay State Beach

References

External links
 Half Moon Bay SB California State Park

Bays of California
Bodies of water of San Mateo County, California
Half Moon Bay, California
Landforms of San Mateo County, California